Wild Card is the second and final album by the Dutch progressive metal band ReVamp. The album was released on 23 August 2013 in Europe, on 26 August in the UK and on 3 September 2013 in the USA.

Track listing
All tracks written by Floor Jansen, Jord Otto, Ruben Wijga, and Joost van den Broek.

 "'The Anatomy of a Nervous Breakdown': On the Sideline" – 3:45
 "'The Anatomy of a Nervous Breakdown': The Limbic System" – 4:54
 "Wild Card" – 4:21
 "Precibus" – 4:24
 "Nothing" – 3:53
 "'The Anatomy of a Nervous Breakdown': Neurasthenia" – 5:06
 "Distorted Lullabies" – 4:58
 "Amendatory" – 4:47
 "I Can Become" – 3:48
 "Misery's No Crime" – 4:03
 "Wolf and Dog" – 5:01
 "Sins" (bonus track) – 4:05
 "Infringe" (bonus track) – 4:53

Personnel
Band members
Floor Jansen – vocals, grunts (except on track 10)
Arjan Rijnen – guitars
Jord Otto – guitars
Ruben Wijga – keyboards
Matthias Landes – drums

Guest musicians
Johan van Stratum – bass
Mark Jansen – grunts on track 10
Devin Townsend – vocals on track 6
Marcela Bovio, Daniël de Jongh – choir vocals

Charts

References

External links
ReVamp's official website

2013 albums
ReVamp albums
Nuclear Blast albums